Kečkovce is a village and municipality in Svidník District in the Prešov Region of north-eastern Slovakia.

History
In historical records the village was first mentioned in 1582.

Geography
The municipality lies at an altitude of 402 metres and covers an area of 12.798 km². It has a population of about 220 people.

Genealogical resources
The records for genealogical research are available at the state archive "Statny Archiv in Presov, Slovakia"

 Greek Catholic church records (births/marriages/deaths): 1881-1895 (parish A)

See also
 List of municipalities and towns in Slovakia

References

External links
 
Surnames of living people in Keckovce

Villages and municipalities in Svidník District
Populated places established in 1582
Šariš